The 2012–13 Magyar Kupa (English: Hungarian Cup) was the 73rd season of Hungary's annual knock-out cup football competition. It started with the first match of Round 1 on 12 August 2012 and ended with the Final held in May 2013 at Bozsik József Stadion, Budapest. Debrecen were the defending champions, having won their fifth cup competition last season. The winner of the competition will qualify for the second qualifying round of the 2013–14 UEFA Europa League.

Round of 128
Matches were played on 12 August 2012 and involved the teams qualified through the local cup competitions during the previous season, Nemzeti Bajnokság III, Nemzeti Bajnokság II and the Nemzeti Bajnokság I teams.

|-

|}

Round of 64
Matches were played on 26 September 2012 and involved the teams qualified through the local cup competitions during the previous season, Nemzeti Bajnokság III, Nemzeti Bajnokság II and the Nemzeti Bajnokság I teams.

|-

|}

Round of 32
Matches were played on 30 and 31 October 2012. Entering this stage of the competition were the 28 winners from the previous round and the four clubs which competed in Europe this season.

|-

|}

Round of 16 
The sixteen winners of the previous round were drawn into eight two-legged matches. The winners on aggregate advanced to the next round. The first leg will be played on 21 November, the second leg is on 28 November 2012.

|}

Quarter-finals
The eight winners of the previous round were drawn into four two-legged matches. The winners on aggregate advanced to the next round. The first leg will be played on 23 February, the second leg is on 27 February 2013.

|}

Semi-finals
The four winners of the previous round were drawn into two two-legged matches. The winners on aggregate advanced to the final. The first legs were played on 16 and 17 April, the second legs will be played on 7 and 8 May 2013.

|}

First legs

Second Legs

Final

Top goalscorers
Including matches played on 23 May 2013; Source: MLSZ

See also
 2012–13 Nemzeti Bajnokság I
 2012–13 Nemzeti Bajnokság II
 2012–13 Ligakupa

References

External links
 Official site 
 soccerway.com

Magyar
2012–13 domestic association football cups
2012–13